Summer Scent is a 2003 South Korean television series starring Song Seung-heon, Son Ye-jin, Ryu Jin, and Han Ji-hye. It is the third installment of season-themed tetralogy Endless Love drama series directed by Yoon Seok-ho. It aired on KBS2 from July 7 to September 9, 2003, on Mondays and Tuesdays at 21:55 (KST) for 20 episodes.

The series had an average viewership rating of 10.7% and reached a peak viewership of 11.6%.

Plot
Yoo Min-woo's (Song Seung-heon) first love was Seo Eun-hye (Shin Ae). However, Eun-hye gets into a car accident and dies. Without Min-woo's knowledge, her parents decide to donate her organs. Shim Hye-won (Son Ye-jin) has suffered from a possibly fatal heart disease ever since childhood. Miraculously, she finds that she will be obtaining a heart from a donor, the deceased Eun-hye.

Suffering from the pain of losing his girlfriend, Min-woo goes to Italy to study, with the memories of Eun-hye still lingering in his heart. When he returns to Korea, fate takes a turn and brings Hye-won and Min-woo together. When the two first meet at the airport, Hye-won's heart (Eun-hye's heart) oddly beats faster when she is around Min-woo.

Park Jung-jae (Ryu Jin) is Hye-won's fiancé. Jung-jae's younger sister, Park Jung-ah (Han Ji-hye) meets Min-woo in Italy and falls for him. Meanwhile, Min-woo feels guilt towards Eun-hye, because his feelings of love are stirred once again as he keeps being around Hye-won.

Coincidentally, Min-woo ends up being hired as the art director for Jung-jae's project "Summer Scent," with Hye-won as their florist. Hiding their prior encounter in the forest, they awkwardly greet each other as if they'd never met. During the project, their fondness deepens, and Min-woo begins to "recognize" similarities between Eun-hye and Hye-won. Hye-won, on the other hand, believes it to be fate that her heart beats faster whenever Min-woo is near. Their fondness for each other soon triggers Jung-ah's and shortly thereafter, Jung-jae's suspicions. Jung-jae, however, chooses to turn a blind eye as he deeply loves Hye-won. It is then Hye-won's turn to be confused as to whether her feelings for Min-woo are true, or a physiological result of Eun-hye's past feelings for him. As a result, she decides to leave Min-woo, trying to cover up her feelings of guilt towards Jung-jae and Jung-ah. She returns to Jung-jae's side and agrees to marry him.

To forget Hye-won, Min-woo decides to leave for Italy indefinitely, but only after seeing her one last time. At Hye-won's wedding, Min-woo casts one last glance at her and then leaves. With Min-woo near, Hye-won's heart once more signals his presence, and thus alerted, she sees Min-woo leaving. Desperately trying to catch Min-woo, Hye-won collapses. Min-woo rushes Hye-won to the hospital with Jung-jae arriving a little later. Jung-jae, angry at Min-woo for having caused Hye-won's collapse, tells him to leave for Italy but Min-woo agrees to leave only after Hye-won has regained consciousness. Soon, Hye-won wakes up and a deeply angered Jung-jae forbids Min-woo to see her, ordering him to leave on the spot. However, Min-woo agrees to leave only after Hye-won promises him to undergo heart surgery, for not having the operation would mean her certain demise.

Soon after his arrival in Italy, Min-woo receives a letter notifying him that Hye-won died during the operation.

Three years later, with memories of Hye-won in his heart, Min-woo returns to Korea as the manager of an Art Centre. During his absence, Hye-won has undergone a heart transplant after the initial surgery, and then traveled to the United States for another transplant. On his way up the steps to the Art Centre and on her way down after her delivery, they meet again. The abnormal beating of Hye-won's new heart signals Min-woo's presence to her, and thus once and for all, confirms their love for each other to be authentic.

Cast 
 Song Seung-heon as Yoo Min-woo
 Son Ye-jin as Shim Hye-won
 Ryu Jin as Park Jung-jae
 Han Ji-hye as Park Jung-Ah
 Shin Ae as Seo Eun-hye
 Jo Eun-sook as Oh Jang-mi
 Ahn Jung-hoon as Ji Dae-poong
 Kim Hae-sook as Min-woo's mother
 Kim Yong-gun as Min-woo's father
 Ha Jae-young
 Kang Ji-hwan as Jung-ah's husband (bit part, ep 20)

Filming locations 
The following filming locations were featured in the series:
Boseong Tea Gardens
Korea Botanical Garden
Deogyusan National Park
Muju Resort

Soundtrack 
Released: August 5, 2003
Label: Yedang Entertainment

 Main Title 
  (Secret) - Jung In-ho
 Missing U - Seo Jin-young
  (Perhaps) - Seo Jin-young
  (Summer Scent) - Jung In-ho
 Serenade Instrumental (Guitar) 
 Second Romance - Seo Jin-young
  2 (Summer Scent 2) Instrumental
  (Second Time in Love) - Seo Jin-young
  (Perhaps) Instrumental (Piano) 
 Serenade - Yoo Mi-sook (Soprano)
  (Secret) Inst. (Piano)
  (Second Time in Love) Inst. (Piano & Guitar)
 Love - Seo Jin-young
  (Secret) Instrumental (Guitar)
  (If I Said I Loved You) - Jung In-ho & Seo Jin-young
  (Fox Rain) Instrumental
 Love Instrumental (Piano & Guitar)

See also 
Heart
Organ transplant
Cellular memory
List of Korean television shows
Contemporary culture of South Korea

References

External links 
  
Summer Scent official KBS website 

2003 South Korean television series debuts
2003 South Korean television series endings
Korean Broadcasting System television dramas
Korean-language television shows
South Korean romance television series
South Korean melodrama television series
Television series by Pan Entertainment